The Ford-Cosworth Indy V8 engine is a series of mechanically similar, turbocharged, 2.65-liter, Indy car racing V-8 engines, designed and developed by Cosworth in partnership with Ford. It was produced for over 30 years. It was used in U.S.A.C. Championship Car, C.A.R.T., and later Champ Car World Series; between 1976 and 2007.  The DFX engine was the Indy car version of the highly successful 3-liter Cosworth DFV Formula One engine developed by former Lotus engineer Keith Duckworth and Colin Chapman, with financial backing from Ford for the Lotus 49 to campaign the 1967 season. This engine had 155 wins between 1967 and 1985 in F1. The DFX variant was initially developed for Indy car use by Parnelli Jones in 1976, with Cosworth soon taking over.  This engine won the Indianapolis 500 ten consecutive years from 1978 to 1987, as well as winning all USAC and CART championships between 1977 and 1987. It powered 81 consecutive Indy car victories from 1981 to 1986, with 153 Indy car victories total.

DFX 
One of the most successful and longest-lived projects of Cosworth has been its CART / Champ Car engine program. Ford backed Cosworth with creating a new interim design for IndyCar racing in the late 1980s, the DFS, which merged DFR technology into the aging DFX design, but it was eventually rendered obsolete by advancing technology.

A 2.65-L turbocharged version of the DFV was developed privately by the Vels Parnelli Jones team for the 1976 U.S.A.C. season, in the face of opposition from Duckworth. The Parnelli-Cosworth car took its first victory at the 1976 Pocono 500, the fifth race of the season, driven by Al Unser. Unser and his Cosworth-powered Parnelli took two further victories before the end of the year, in Wisconsin and Phoenix, and finished the championship in fourth position.

Duckworth had been a guest of the Vels Parnelli team during the Pocono victory, as Parnelli Jones and Vel Miletich wanted to establish the team as the North American distributor for the turbocharged, Indycar-specification engine. However, shortly after the maiden race victory Cosworth poached two key engineers from the Parnelli team and set up facilities in Torrance, California, to develop and market the engine themselves. Henceforth it became known as the DFX. It went on to dominate American Indy car racing in much the same way the DFV had dominated Formula One. The engine won the Indianapolis 500 ten consecutive years from 1978 until 1987, as well as winning all U.S.A.C. and CART championships between 1977 and 1987 except for one. For a brief time in the early 1980s, some of the DFX engines were badged as Fords. The DFX powered 81 consecutive Indy car victories from 1981 to 1986, and 153 victories total.

DFS 
In 1986 GM financed the British Ilmor firm to build a competitor to the DFX in American Indy car racing. Mario Illien's Ilmor-Chevrolet Indy V-8, which owed not a little to the DFY of five years earlier, quickly took over dominance of the sport.

Ford responded by commissioning Cosworth to redesign the DFX to include a number of DFR improvements. In 1989, they introduced an updated "short stroke" version of the Indy car engine which would be referred to as the "DFS" ("S" for short stroke)., and the Nikasil Aluminium liners, adopted on DFY in 1983.

The engine was fielded by two teams in its first season: Kraco Racing (Bobby Rahal) and Dick Simon Racing (Arie Luyendyk), and its development was an effort to regain dominance of the sport. At Indy, neither car qualified in the front two rows, but both started in the top ten. On race day, both drivers dropped out with engine failures. Rahal won one race in 1989 at the Meadowlands. However, the Kraco team merged with Galles at season's end, dropped the program, and switched to Chevrolets.

In 1990, the factory development was continued by Scott Brayton and Dominic Dobson, but neither won any races. The engine was utilized by other CART teams in 1991–1992, and was retired after the introduction of the Ford Cosworth XB with only one victory, that being Rahal's in 1989.

XB / XD / XF / XFE 
Cosworth designed a series of replacements for the DFS to be used in IndyCar and Champ Car racing: the X-series, beginning in 1992 with the XB. The XF was developed for the 2000 season to replace the XD, and was chosen as the spec engine for the Champ Car World Series in 2003. The most recent derivative of the XF, the  XFE quad-cam 90° V8 overhead camshaft, continued in that role through the 2007 season. The Champ Car World Series imposed a rev limit of 12,000 rpm down from the over 15,000 rpm of 2002. The aluminium and iron turbo housing ran a boost of 5.9 psi at sea level (= boost of 12 inches of mercury which is 41.5 inches of mercury absolute). The Methanol-fuelled engine used a steel crankshaft and aluminium alloy pistons.

In 2007, the Ford name was removed from the engine pieces as the manufacturer elected not to continue sponsorship of the series. Several other engine changes were made, notably the removal of the calibrated "pop-off valve" designed to limit turbo boost pressure, replaced by engine electronics. Engines were sent by the race teams to Cosworth for the rebuild. In 2007, Champ Car switched to the new Panoz DP01 chassis, which was said to provide better ducting of airflow into the engine. The Champ Car World Series merged into the Indy Racing League IndyCar Series prior to the 2008 season, and Cosworth does not currently provide engines to any American open-wheel racing series.

There is evidence that Cosworth was working on a  push-rod V8 along the lines of the Ilmor/Mercedes 500I to exploit the peculiar loophole in the Indianapolis 500 rules on the definition of the word "pushrod engine", permitting such engines with extremely short pushrods higher turbocharger boost – this was assigned a project code CD but seemingly never completed.

In mid-2003, Cosworth provided the 3.5 L V8 XG badged as a Chevrolet Gen 4 engine to IRL IndyCar Series teams after the proprietary Ilmor-built Chevrolet Gen 3 engine proved inadequate against rival Hondas and Toyotas during the 2003 season. While many teams left Chevrolet after the 2003 season, those that stayed saw a significant improvement in performance with the new "Chevworth" engine compared to their previous units. The XG finished second in its first race at Michigan on July 27, 2003. Sam Hornish, Jr. went on to win 3 races that season with the new XG. The XG was reduced in size to 3 L for the 2004 season and it won one race in 2005 during Chevrolet's final season in IRL.

References

Engines by model
Ford engines
Cosworth
IndyCar Series
Champ Car
V8 engines